Michałówka  is a village in the administrative district of Gmina Rutka-Tartak, within Suwałki County, Podlaskie Voivodeship, in north-eastern Poland, close to the border with Lithuania.

References
 List of sołectwos in Gmina Rutka-Tartak 

Villages in Suwałki County